Suleyman Ahmadov (born on 25 November 1999) is an Azerbaijani professional footballer who plays as a midfielder for Sumgayit in the Azerbaijan Premier League.

Career

Club
On 20 November 2016, Ahmadov made his debut in the Azerbaijan Premier League for Sumgayit match against Neftçi Baku.

References

External links
 

1999 births
Living people
Association football midfielders
Azerbaijani footballers
Azerbaijan under-21 international footballers
Azerbaijan youth international footballers
Azerbaijan Premier League players
Sumgayit FK players
People from Sumgait